Liberapay is a platform for recurrent donations. It is maintained by a non-profit organization of the same name, registered in France in 2015. The platform is primarily aimed at funding free and open-source software, art and knowledge, but other uses are allowed.

Service 
The service does not charge a fee on donations aside from that required by the underlying payment processors, instead financing its own activity through donations handled by the service itself in the same way as donations to third-parties are handled. As of October 2020, Liberapay uses payment processors PayPal and Stripe.

Liberapay has been compared to Patreon. Unlike other crowdfunding platforms, Liberapay does not allow creators to reward their patrons. This difference in the nature of the transactions has tax implications. For example, Patreon collects VAT on all payments made from inside the European Union whereas Liberapay does not.

History 
Started in 2015 in France, Liberapay began as a fork of the now-defunct US-based platform Gratipay.com (originally known as Gittip), which had undergone changes after facing legal issues. At the end of that year, the operators of the platform established a nonprofit organization under the 1901 law of associations.

Initially, Liberapay's only supported currency was the euro. Support for the US dollar was added in December 2017 (one month after Gratipay announced that it would shut down); support for 31 other currencies was added in 2018.

In 2018, Liberapay had to respond to Mangopay withdrawing its services as payment processor. Support for two other payment processors was added, but the way the platform works had to change. In the same year Medium briefly suspended the organisation's blog account, claiming they were publishing articles about cryptocurrencies.

In January 2021, Liberapay announced donations reached €8000 per week, a 150% year over year increase, with 5977 patrons and 912 creators.

In 2022, Liberapay started using machine translation services to automatically complete the translations of its website.

Reception 
In 2018, Jason van Gumster writing for RedHat's Opensource said distinguishing factors of Liberapay were target audience, Open Source, lack of fees on payments, and non-profit status. F-Droid announced support for Liberapay and integration of support for apps.

Liberapay was one of six funding platforms recommended by Elaine A. Clark in her 2020 book Voice-Overs for Podcasting: How to Develop a Career and Make a Profit.

References

External links
 
 Liberapay Code Repository on GitHub

Financial services companies established in 2016
Crowdfunding platforms of France
Creative Commons-licensed websites